Eddie Talboom (May 15, 1921 – June 6, 1998) was an All-American football player (1952) from the University of Wyoming.

Football career
Talboom began his career at Notre Dame, but moved to the University of Wyoming after serving in World War II. It was there that Talboom achieved the Cowboys' rushing touchdown record of 34. His total of 10.8 average points per game places Talboom fifth in NCAA history.

Awards and distinctions
Talboom won the Gator Bowl MVP award in 1951 and was posthumously elected to the College Football Hall of Fame in 2000.

Personal life
Outside of his football career, Talboom was a teacher.

References

1921 births
Wyoming Cowboys football players
1998 deaths
People from Delphos, Ohio
Players of American football from Ohio
American military personnel of World War II